Masdevallia odontocera, the tusked masdevallia, is a species of epiphytic orchid native to the cloud forests of Colombia.  The species name is derived from Greek odontoceras, meaning "a tusk".  This is in reference to the appearance of the lateral sepals.

References

External links
 Masdevallia odontocera at the Encyclopedia of Life

odontocera
Orchids of Colombia
Epiphytic orchids